Gabriela Alexandra Reyes Hinojosa (born 6 November 1992) is a retired Dominica female volleyball player. She was part of the Dominican Republic women's national volleyball team.

She participated in the 2010 FIVB Volleyball Women's World Championship. She played with Mirador.

Clubs
  Mirador (2010)

References

1992 births
Living people
Dominican Republic women's volleyball players
Wing spikers
Place of birth missing (living people)